West Pullman is a commuter rail station along the Blue Island Branch of the Metra Electric line in the West Pullman neighborhood of Chicago, Illinois.

Although most of the Blue Island Branch contains only one track, there are two tracks at West Pullman. The only other station along the branch that has two tracks is the terminus at Blue Island itself. One parking lot exists on the north side of the tracks along the southbound lane of Halsted Street. Due to its close proximity to the outskirts of Chicago, the station provides bus connections from both the Chicago Transit Authority and Pace suburban bus system.

A station typology adopted by the Chicago Plan Commission on October 16, 2014, assigns the West Pullman station a typology of Mixed Residential/Industrial Neighborhood (MRIN). This typology is an area in which the Metra station serves both residential and industrial uses. Like most of the MRIN stations, the does not have access to CTA rail.

Bus connections
CTA
  8A South Halsted 
  108 Halsted/95th 

Pace
  352 Halsted 
  359 Robbins/South Kedzie Avenue

References

External links

Halsted Street entrance from Google Maps Street View

Metra stations in Chicago